Richard E. Petty is university professor of psychology at Ohio State University.

He received his Ph.D. in social psychology from Ohio State in 1977.  After graduation Richard E. Petty went on to start his academic career as the assistant professor of psychology at the University of Missouri, and in 1985 he was named the Frederick A. Middlebush Professor of Psychology.  In 1987 he returned to Ohio State University for an appointment as a professor of psychology and director of the Social Psychology Doctoral Program and has been a distinguished university professor since 1998.  He served as chair of the Psychology Department from 1998 to 2002 and again from 2008 to the present.

Petty’s research focuses on the situational and individual differences factors responsible for changes in beliefs, attitudes, and behaviors.  More specifically, his current work  examines the Elaboration Likelihood Model of persuasion.  This model is used to understand prejudice, consumer choice, political and legal decisions, and health behaviors.

He  has been a consultant and panelist for the National Academy of Sciences Committee on Dietary Guidelines Implementation to Improve the Health of Americans and the Committee for a Social Psychology of Aging, the National Institute on Drug Abuse panel on Using Persuasive Communication to Prevent Drug Abuse, and the National Science Foundation panel on the Human Dimensions of Global Change.

Awards and honors
In 1999, he was named as distinguished scientist-lecturer for the American Psychological Association. In 2000 Petty received the award for Distinguished Scientific Contributions to Consumer Psychology from the Society for Consumer Psychology.  In 2001 he received the Donald T. Campbell Award for Distinguished Scientific Contributions to Social Psychology from the Society for Personality and Social Psychology. Petty is a fellow in the American Association for the Advancement of Science, the American Psychological Association, and the Association for Psychological Science.

Petty served as editor of the SPSP journal, Personality and Social Psychology Bulletin, and as associate editor for the APA journal, Emotion, and on the editorial boards of the Journal of Personality and Social Psychology, the Journal of Experimental Social Psychology, the Personality and Social Psychology Review, the Journal of Consumer Psychology, and Media Psychology.  In 2002 Petty served as president of the Midwestern Psychological Association and in 2009 he served as president of the Society for Personality and Social Psychology.

References

External links
 Ohio State University web page

Ohio State University faculty
Ohio State University Graduate School alumni
Living people
Year of birth missing (living people)